The Man from Barbarossa, first published in 1991, was the eleventh novel by John Gardner featuring Ian Fleming's secret agent, James Bond. Carrying the Glidrose Publications copyright, it was first published in the United Kingdom by Hodder & Stoughton and in the United States by Putnam.

More so than any previous Bond novel, The Man from Barbarossa acknowledges then-current world events. The story begins in January 1991 just prior to the end of the Persian Gulf War, and later includes a description of the early stage of the war against Iraq. Gardner also predicted that hardliners within the Soviet Union might attempt a coup against the government, which did occur later in 1991 but under different circumstances. The book also strongly suggests that the Cold War was soon to end, which did occur that year in December.

John Gardner has stated on many occasions that of the 007 novels he wrote, this is his favourite because it was different and had a more creative approach than all his previous attempts. Additionally, Gardner believes that of all his novels, this was Glidrose's favourite as well, although the American publishers took a strong dislike to it. Critics were mixed, with many feeling it was one of Gardner's lesser Bond novels.

Plot summary
The Man from Barbarossa begins with a prelude that includes some background information on the Nazi invasion of the Soviet Union codenamed Operation Barbarossa, the massacre at Babi Yar that occurred not long after, and information on Josif Voronstov, a fictional character said to be a deputy of real-life Paul Blobel who was primarily responsible for the massacre.

When the story begins, an elderly American living in New Jersey is kidnapped by a Russian terrorist group called the "Scales of Justice". The man, Joel Penderek, was captured under the belief that he is Josif Voronstov, the war criminal partially responsible for the massacre at Babi Yar. The group demands the Soviet government put the man on trial for his crimes, and begins murdering government officials when leaders refuse and are slow to react. The situation is slightly more complicated as the CIA and the Mossad believe Voronstov to be a man located in Florida who they had under surveillance.

Captain James Bond is partnered with an Israeli Mossad agent, Pete Natkowitz, and two agents from the French Secret Service, Henri Rampart and Stephanie Adoré. They are assigned to work with Bory Stepakov and his assistant Nina Bibikova from the KGB to infiltrate the Scales of Justice posing as a TV crew so as to discover their real motive. Accomplishing this, they learn that the group plans to sabotage perestroika and supply Iraq with nuclear weapons before the United Nations-led coalition invades.

The man behind the Scales of Justice, General Yevgeny Yuskovich, is a cousin of Josif Voronstov who is identified as Joel Penderek. The trial was staged in order to shift focus away from Yuskovich's other plans.

Characters
 James Bond
 M
 Bill Tanner
 Miss Moneypenny
 Josif Voronstov: Deputy to Paul Blobel, the instigator of the massacre at Babi Yar. Said to have driven the victims to their deaths. Is actually Joel Penderek who is captured in Hawthorne, New Jersey by the Scales of Justice. Voronstov is put on a mock trial where it is discovered he is the cousin of General Yevgeny Yuskovich.
 General Yevgeny Yuskovich: Yuskovich is the leader of the Scales of Justice and the primary villain of the novel. He attempts to sabotage perestroika and supply Iraq with nuclear arms.

Publication history
 UK first hardback edition: August 1991 Hodder & Stoughton
 U.S. first hardback edition: May 1991 Putnam
 UK first paperback edition: 1991 Coronet Books
 U.S. first paperback edition: January 1992 Berkley Books

See also
 Outline of James Bond

References

1991 British novels
James Bond books
Novels by John Gardner (British writer)
Cold War spy novels
Hodder & Stoughton books
Novels set in England
Novels set in New Jersey
Novels set in the Soviet Union
Novels set in Sweden